Christian Franzen may refer to:
 Christian Franzen (photographer) (1864–1923), Danish photographer and diplomat based in Spain
 Christian Franzen (businessman) (1845–1920), American politician, farmer, and businessman

See also
Franzen